The 2019–20 season will be Al-Minaa's 44th season in the Iraqi Premier League, having featured in all 46 editions of the competition except two. Al-Minaa are participating in the Iraqi Premier League and the Iraq FA Cup.

They enter this season having finished in a disappointing 17th place in the league in the 2018–19 season, and will be looking to wrestle back the title they won in the 1977–78 season.

The season started on 18 September 2019 in a double round-robin format, but was postponed after 23 October 2019 due to the 2019 Iraqi protests with matches from the first four rounds having been played, Al-Minaa ranked first in the ranking table during these four rounds.

On 25 January 2020, after the withdrawal of five of the 20 teams that started the season, the Iraq Football Association (IFA) decided to annul the results of all the matches that had been played so far and to cancel relegation for the season. The league will be restarted on 16 February 2020 as a single round-robin tournament.

Matches from the first five rounds of the restarted season were played, but the season was postponed after 10 March 2020 due to the COVID-19 pandemic, and it was officially cancelled on 3 June 2020.

Squad

Transfers

In

Out

Personnel

Technical staff
{| class="toccolours"
!bgcolor=silver|Position
!bgcolor=silver|Name
!bgcolor=silver|Nationality
|- bgcolor=#eeeeee
|Manager:||Valeriu Tița||
|- 
|Assistant manager:||Ammar Rihawi||
|- bgcolor=#eeeeee
| Goalkeeping coach:||Saddam Salman||
|-
| Fitness coach:||Florin||
|-bgcolor=#eeeeee
|Administrative director:||Jihad Madlool||
|-
| Club doctor:||Sebastian||
|-

Board members

Goalscorers

Last updated: 7 March 2020

Assists

Last updated: 7 March 2020

Penalties

Disciplinary record

Last updated: 7 March 2020

Clean sheets

Last updated: 22 February 2020

Overall statistics

Last updated: 7 March 2020

External links
 Results of Al-Minaa SC on a FIFA.COM 
 Iraqi League 2019/2020
 Al-Minaa SC: Transfers and News

References 

Al-Mina'a SC seasons